Zhang Boya may refer to:

Zhang Boya (Han dynasty), Chinese politician during the Han dynasty, whose tomb is at Dahuting
Chang Po-ya (born 1942), Taiwanese politician